This is a discography of the American pop punk and rock band Blink-182. They have released eight studio albums, one live album, two compilation albums, three video albums, two extended plays (EPs), twenty-four singles, six promotional singles, and twenty-two music videos. Their recording material was distributed mainly by subdivisions of Universal Music Group, including Geffen Records, Interscope Records, and DGC Records. They have also released material under MCA Records, Cargo Music and its subdivision Grilled Cheese, Kung Fu Records, and BMG. The band currently consists of bassist and vocalist Mark Hoppus, drummer Travis Barker, and guitarist and vocalist Tom DeLonge. Founded by Hoppus, guitarist and vocalist Tom DeLonge, and drummer Scott Raynor, the band emerged from the Southern California punk scene of the early 1990s and first gained notoriety for high-energy live shows and irreverent lyrical toilet humor. Blink-182 has sold over 13 million albums in the United States, and over 50 million albums worldwide. The band is known for bringing the genre of pop punk into the mainstream.

The band recorded three demos, including the commercially available Buddha, before signing to San Diego-based independent label Cargo Music in 1994. Cargo issued the band's debut album, Cheshire Cat, in 1995. The band signed with major label MCA Records to co-distribute 1997's Dude Ranch. The album was their first to chart on the Billboard 200, peaking at number 67. Dude Ranch also featured their first radio hit, "Dammit", which helped the album reach Platinum status in the United States. The following album, Enema of the State (1999), was met with more commercial success, reaching top ten positions in several countries, including the United States. Its singles, "What's My Age Again?", "All the Small Things", and "Adam's Song", became airplay and MTV staples. "All the Small Things" became the most successful of the three, reaching number-one on the Alternative Songs chart, but also became a crossover hit and peaked at number six on the Billboard Hot 100 chart. Enema of the State is Blink-182's most successful album, certified five times platinum in the United States for having shipped five million units. It has sold over 15 million worldwide.

Their fourth album, Take Off Your Pants and Jacket (2001), reached the number-one spot in the United States, Canada, and Germany. In its first week, the album sold more than 350,000 copies in the United States, eventually being certified double Platinum by the RIAA. The first two singles, ("The Rock Show" and "First Date") achieved moderate success internationally, while its third and final single "Stay Together for the Kids" had a weaker impact. The eponymously titled Blink-182 followed in 2003 and marked a stylistic shift for the group, infusing experimental elements into their usual pop punk formula, resulting in a more mature sound. The album spawned four singles: "Feeling This", "I Miss You", "Down", and "Always", with "I Miss You" having the greatest success and narrowly missing the top 40 of the Billboard Hot 100. "Feeling This" and "I Miss You", along with "All the Small Things" and "Bored To Death", remain the best-selling of the group's singles, which have all been certified Gold by the RIAA. DeLonge left the group in 2005, sending the band into what was termed an "indefinite hiatus."

The trio reunited in 2009, and their sixth studio album, Neighborhoods, was released in 2011. While it was a top ten success on many charts around the globe, it did not prove to be as successful as their last album, and its singles "Up All Night" and "After Midnight" had weaker success on the charts in comparison to previous releases. Dogs Eating Dogs, an extended play containing new material, was self-released by the band after they departed their record label DGC in 2012, whom the group had been with since they reunited. After a second falling-out with DeLonge which resulted in his departure in January 2015, the band recruited Skiba as a replacement. The album's production was expedited without DeLonge, and their seventh record California was released in 2016. It was the band's first album to reach number-one on any chart since before the band's breakup, and their first ever in the UK; and each song from the album managed to reach chart positions in the US and the UK.

The band's eighth studio album, Nine, was released on September 20, 2019.

Albums

Studio albums

Live albums

Compilation albums

Extended plays

Demos

Splits

Singles

As lead artist

1990s

2000s

2010s

2020s

As featured artist

Promotional singles

Other charted songs

Guest appearances

Videography

Video albums

Music videos

See also
 List of songs recorded by Blink-182

Notes

References

Citations

Sources

External links

Blink-182 discography at AllMusic

Blink-182
Discographies of American artists
Pop punk group discographies